Frank Schulz (born February 18, 1961) is a German former footballer who became a coach.

Honours
 DFB-Pokal winner: 1988
 DFB-Pokal finalist: 1992

References

1961 births
Living people
German footballers
VfL Bochum players
Eintracht Frankfurt players
VfL Osnabrück players
Borussia Mönchengladbach players
Alemannia Aachen players
Bundesliga players
German football managers
SC Westfalia Herne managers
BV Cloppenburg managers
SSVg Velbert managers
Association football midfielders
People from Remscheid
Sportspeople from Düsseldorf (region)
Footballers from North Rhine-Westphalia